Bash Abdan (also Romanized as Bāsh Ābdān, Bāshābdān, and Bāshābadān; also known as Bāshādān) is a village in Balvard Rural District, in the Central District of Sirjan County, Kerman Province, Iran. At the 2006 census, its population was 92, in 20 families.

References 

Populated places in Sirjan County